Tamela D'Amico is an American singer, actress, and filmmaker who started the production company La Strega Entertainment in 2006 and BELLONA Entertainment in 2020.

Career 
D'Amico was one of 24 finalists on the FOX television reality show On the Lot produced by Steven Spielberg and Mark Burnett. She received attention from the show's producers with her entry film entitled Volare starring Federico Castelluccio.

D'Amico attended film school at Florida State University and studied at the Lee Strasberg Theatre and Film Institute in Los Angeles. She produced and directed the internet program Sex Ed: The Series. She has created internet programs for Atom Films, Funny or Die, Frog Island, Comedy ETC and Comedy Central. Her debut jazz album, Got a Little Story, was executive produced by actor Peter Krause and Jimmy Hoyson and arranged by Chris Walden. She executive produced the album Big Band Jazz for Billy Vera and sang a duet with him on one song on the album. She acted the part of Janet Smythe on the program Best Friends Whenever and appeared in the film Walt Before Mickey. She has also appeared in the Amazon series Englishman in L.A. She has modeled for Alison Raffaele Cosmetic and Mellow World Handbags. She was named Outstanding Actress in a Comedy Web Series at the Los Angeles Web Series Festival. Sex Ed: The Series was nominated for a Streamy Award and a Webby Award.

Discography
 Like One (2004)
I Can't Sleep (2005)
The Tamela D'Amico Album (2007)
 Got a Little Story (2009)
Down With Love (2010)
Love and the Gun (feat. Tamela D'Amico) (2014)
I'll Never Be Free (feat. Tamela D'Amico) (2015)
Winter Wonderland (2016)
Christmas Lights (2016)

Film

Television

Music Videos

References

External links
 Official site

Living people
Year of birth missing (living people)
American women pop singers
Participants in American reality television series
American women film directors
American film actresses
Torch singers
Traditional pop music singers
Singers from New York City
Singers from Los Angeles
20th-century American actresses
21st-century American actresses
20th-century American singers
21st-century American singers
20th-century American women singers
21st-century American women singers